Gelkhen is a rural locality (a selo) and the administrative centre of Gelkhensky Selsoviet, Kurakhsky District, Republic of Dagestan, Russia. The population was 577 as of 2010. There are 4 streets.

Nationalities 
Lezgins live there.

Geography
Gelkhen is located 20 km northwest of Kurakh (the district's administrative centre) by road. Usug and Khlyuk are the nearest rural localities.

References 

Rural localities in Kurakhsky District